The Brisen is a mountain of the Urner Alps, located on the border between the cantons of Nidwalden and Uri, in Central Switzerland. It is located near the slightly higher Hoh Brisen.

The western ridge named Haldigrat is the easiest way to the summit.

References

External links
 Brisen on Hikr

Mountains of Switzerland
Mountains of the Alps
Mountains of the canton of Uri
Mountains of Nidwalden
Nidwalden–Uri border
Two-thousanders of Switzerland